Scopula nemorivagata is a moth of the  family Geometridae. It is found in Ethiopia, Nigeria and South Africa.

References

Moths described in 1863
nemorivagata
Insects of Ethiopia
Moths of Africa